The Worcestershire County Cricket League (WCL) is an English club cricket league, and consists of club teams primarily from Worcestershire, as well as several other clubs from bordering counties Herefordshire, Shropshire, Staffordshire and Warwickshire.

History
The Worcestershire County Cricket League was created in 1999 as part of the new 'pyramid system' in English club cricket, and acts as a feeder league to the Birmingham and District Premier League.  It was formed mainly as a merger between the old Worcestershire Clubs' League and the Autobag/Plumb Centre League.  Other clubs came from the Midland Combined Counties League, the 3D Cricket PLJ League, and in the case of Herefordshire sides, the Marches Cricket League and the Willowsticks Three Counties Cricket League.  For the 2023 season the WCL took over the administration of the Marches League (the only open age cricket league based in Herefordshire, which also included some clubs from Wales), thereby adding another 29 sides and 17 new clubs. 

There is promotion and relegation and most divisions of the league operate on a two up/two down basis, although the feeder league status means that more than two sides may be relegated from the Premier Division, with knock-on effects on other divisions, if one or more Worcestershire (also Herefordshire in the past) side is relegated from Birmingham League Division 1.  Other exceptions to this are in the Premier Division (where the winner is only promoted to the Birmingham and District Premier League if they finish in the top 2 out of the 4 feeder league champions, after a round-robin competition between the 4 sides at the end of the season).

In the two regionalised Division 7 leagues (North & South) the winners go up to Division 6 and the two bottom placed teams in each division are relegated to the Division 8 regional leagues.  In the five regionalised Division 8 leagues (North, South, East, West, & Marches League Division 1) the winners of each of the five divisions and the three best-placed runners-up go into end of season playoffs, with the winners of the first round of playoffs going into Divisions 7 North & South for the following season.  

Winners of Division 1/Premier Division of the Worcestershire County Cricket League, who have been promoted to the Birmingham and District Premier League, since 1999 are:

WCL Division 1
1999: Hagley
2000: Redditch 
2001: Kington
2002: Old Elizabethans
2003: Evesham
2004: Pershore
2005: Ombersley
2006: Kington
2007: Brockhampton
2008: Eastnor
2009: Pershore
2010: Barnards Green
2011: Stourbridge
2012: Worcester Nomads
2013: Astwood Bank
2014: Worcester
2015: Pershore
2016: Worcester Nomads
2017: Redditch
2018: Bewdley* (no promotion)

WCL Premier Division
2019: Astwood Bank (not promoted after finishing 3rd in Birmingham League playoffs)
2020: Pershore** (no promotion, won a shortened season played in a regional format followed by playoffs)
2021: Stourbridge (not promoted after finishing 3rd in Birmingham League playoffs)
2022: Stourport (ruled ineligible for promotion by Birmingham League. Second-placed Old Hill took their place in the playoffs: they were not promoted after finishing 3rd)  

In 2018 there was no promotion from any of the four county feeder leagues due to the restructuring of the Birmingham & District Premier League.

In 2020 there was no promotion from any of the four county feeder leagues due to the shortened season resulting from the COVID-19 pandemic.

From 2019 onwards the winners of the Worcestershire County League's new Premier Division went into a round-robin playoff at the end of the season with the winners of the Shropshire, Staffordshire and Warwickshire leagues, with the top two sides out of the four being promoted to the Birmingham & District Premier League.

Division 1/Premier Division Championships

3: Pershore                                   (& shortened 2020 season)

2: Astwood Bank, Kington, Redditch, Stourbridge, Worcester Nomads     

1: Barnards Green, Bewdley, Brockhampton, Eastnor, Evesham, Hagley, Old Elizabethans, Ombersley, Stourport, Worcester

Divisional structure

From 1999 until 2018 from Division 1 down to Division 4 there were separate 2nd XI Divisions, with the 4th XI of those sides whose 3rd XIs played in the league competing against other clubs' 2nd XIs.  From 2006, Division 1 and 2 2nd XIs were promoted and relegated independently of their 1st XIs (and 4th XIs could be promoted or relegated independently of their 3rd XIs), from 2007 the same applied to Division 3, and from 2014 this also applied to Division 4.  Clubs could only be promoted from Division 5 if they were able to field two XIs in the following season, and there was a space available in Division 4.

At the end of the 2018 season the league absorbed six 1st XIs that were relegated out of the Birmingham and District Premier League due to the league downsizing from 48 to 24 clubs, as well as 14 2nd XIs, due to the B&DPCL no longer holding a 2nd XI competition from 2019 onwards.  The 1st XIs to be relegated were Astwood Bank, Old Elizabethans, Old Hill, Pershore, Redditch and Stourbridge.  The 2nd XIs that were absorbed by the WCL were Astwood Bank, Barnards Green, Barnt Green, Brockhampton, Bromsgrove, Halesowen, Himley, Kidderminster, Old Elizabethans, Old Hill, Ombersley, Pershore, Redditch, and Stourbridge.

For the 2019 season the league adopted a 'linear structure' so that 1st, 2nd, 3rd, 4th, 5th and 6th XIs would all be part of the same 'ladder system', and theoretically a 2nd, 3rd or 4th XI etc. would be able to be promoted as far as the new WCL Premier Division (one division below the Birmingham and District Premier League).

For the 2021 season several of the league's lower divisions were regionalised, so that the top 8 divisions (Premier to Division 7) remained county wide, but Divisions 8 and 9 were regionalised into North, South, East and West divisions.  For the 2022 season a county wide Division 8 was added, with three regional divisions in Division 9 and four regional divisions in the new Division 10.  This was adjusted again for 2023, with Divisions 7 & 8 being regionalised into Division 7 North & South, and Division 8 being split into four regional divisions of North, South, East & West. At the bottom of the league, Division 9 has two divisions of North and South. 

For the 2023 season the league took over the administration of the Marches Cricket League, with the winners (and potentially 2nd-placed team) in Marches League Division 1 being offered the chance to compete in the Division 8 playoffs. The rest of the Marches League Divisions will operate on a two-up, two down basis, apart from there being no relegation from Division 3.  

For 2023 the Worcestershire County Cricket League will be made up of the following divisions and clubs:

Premier Division                                                                                
Astwood Bank 1st XI
Brockhampton 1st XI
Bromyard 1st XI
Chaddesley Corbett 1st XI
Droitwich Spa 1st XI
Old Elizabethans 1st XI
Old Hill 1st XI
Pershore 1st XI
Redditch Entaco 1st XI
Stourbridge 1st XI
Stourport-on-Severn 1st XI
Worcester Nomads 1st XI

Division 1 
Barnt Green 2nd XI
Bewdley 1st XI
Bromsgrove 2nd XI
Burghill, Tillington & Weobley 1st XI
Colwall 1st XI
Coombs Wood 1st XI
Hagley 1st XI
Halesowen 2nd XI
Lye 1st XI
Ombersley 2nd XI
Pedmore 1st XI
Worcester 1st XI

Division 2
Alvechurch & Hopwood 1st XI
Astwood Bank 2nd XI
Bartestree & Lugwardine 1st XI
Bredon 1st XI 
Cookley 1st XI
Enville 1st XI
Harborne 3rd XI
Himley 2nd XI
Kidderminster 2nd XI
Netherton 1st XI
Oldswinford 1st XI
Redditch Entaco 2nd XI

Division 3
Avoncroft 1st XI
Barnards Green 2nd XI
Belbroughton 1st XI
Brockhampton 2nd XI
Feckenham 1st XI
Himbleton 1st XI
Lye 2nd XI
Martley 1st XI 
Netherton 2nd XI
Old Elizabethans 2nd XI
Old Vigornians 1st XI
Stourbridge 2nd XI

Division 4
Bromsgrove 3rd XI
Chaddesley Corbett 2nd XI 
Claverley 1st XI
Coombs Wood 2nd XI
Five Ways Old Edwardians 1st XI
Harborne 4th XI
Old Hill 2nd XI
Romsley & Hunnington 1st XI
Rushwick 1st XI
Stourport-on-Severn 2nd XI
West Malvern 1st XI
Worcester Nomads 2nd XI

Division 5
Astwood Bank 3rd XI
Barnt Green 3rd XI
Bewdley 2nd XI  
Colwall 2nd XI
Droitwich Spa 2nd XI
Eastnor 1st XI
Hagley 2nd XI
Malvern 1st XI
Pedmore 2nd XI
Pershore 2nd XI
Stourbridge 3rd XI
Worcester 2nd XI

Division 6
Alveley 1st XI
Belbroughton 2nd XI
Bromyard 2nd XI
Claverley 2nd XI 
Cutnall Green
Enville 2nd XI
Halesowen 3rd XI
Hanley Castle & Upton 1st XI 
Kempsey
Kidderminster 3rd XI
Old Vigornians 2nd XI
Tenbury Wells 1st XI

Division 7 (North)
Alvechurch & Hopwood 2nd XI
Bromsgrove 4th XI
Cookhill 1st XI
Feckenham 2nd XI
Five Ways Old Edwardians 2nd XI
Halesowen 4th XI
Harborne 5th XI
Himley 3rd XI
Kidderminster 4th XI
Oldswinford 2nd XI 
Romsley & Hunnington 2nd XI
Stone

Division 7 (South)
Barnards Green 3rd XI
Bartestree & Lugwardine 2nd XI
Birlingham 
Burghill, Tillington & Weobley 2nd XI
Cleobury Mortimer
Harvington 1st XI
Martley 2nd XI
Old Elizabethans 3rd XI
Ombersley 3rd XI
Rushwick 2nd XI
Stourport-on-Severn 3rd XI
Worcester 3rd XI

Division 8 (North)
Avoncroft 3rd XI
Enville 3rd XI
Halesowen 5th XI
Harborne 6th XI
Himley 4th XI
Lye 3rd XI
Netherton 3rd XI
Oldswinford 3rd XI
Pedmore 3rd XI
Stourbridge 4th XI

Division 8 (East)
Astwood Bank 4th XI
Avoncroft 2nd XI
Belbroughton 3rd XI
Droitwich Spa 4th XI
Hagley 3rd XI
Himbleton 2nd XI
Inkberrow
Old Halesonians
Pershore 3rd XI
Redditch Entaco 3rd XI

Division 8 (South)
Bosbury
Bredon 2nd XI
Brockhampton 3rd XI
Bromyard 3rd XI
Colwall 3rd XI
Eastnor 2nd XI
Ledbury 1st XI
Malvern 2nd XI
West Malvern 2nd XI
Worcester Nomads 3rd XI

Division 8 (West)
Alveley 2nd XI
Bewdley 3rd XI
Chaddesley Corbett 3rd XI
Cookley 2nd XI
Droitwich Spa 3rd XI
Hallow Taverners
Highley
Old Elizabethans 4th XI
Tenbury Wells 2nd XI
Worcester Amigos

Marches League Division 1
Almeley 1st XI
Builth Wells 1st XI
Canon Frome 1st XI
Fownhope Strollers 1st XI
Garnons
Goodrich
Luctonians 1st XI
Ross-on-Wye 1st XI
Woolhope 1st XI
Wormelow 1st XI

Division 9 (North)
Cookhill 2nd XI
Coombs Wood 3rd XI
Five Ways Old Edwardians 3rd XI
Halesowen 6th XI
Himley 5th XI
Old Hill 3rd XI
Pedmore 4th XI
Redditch Entaco 4th XI
Stourbridge 5th XI

Division 9 (South)
Barnards Green 4th XI
Brockhampton 4th XI
Droitwich Spa 5th XI
Feckenham 3rd XI
Hanley Castle & Upton 2nd XI
Harvington 2nd XI
Ledbury 2nd XI
Malvern 3rd XI
Pershore 4th XI
Rushwick 3rd XI

Marches League Division 2
Almeley 2nd XI
Builth Wells 2nd XI
Canon Frome 2nd XI
Dales 1st XI
Hay-on-Wye
Kington 1st XI
Knighton-on-Teme
Presteigne
Woolhope 2nd XI
Wormelow 2nd XI

Marches League Division 3
Bartestree & Lugwardine 3rd XI
Burghill, Tillington & Weobley 3rd XI
Dales 2nd XI
Fownhope Strollers 2nd XI
Herefordians
Kington 2nd XI 
Luctonians 2nd XI
Moccas
Ross-on-Wye 2nd XI

Clubs from different counties
For the 2023 season, 82 different clubs will have sides in the league (196 sides in total across the 18 divisions).  

 50 Worcestershire clubs (Alvechurch & Hopwood, Astwood Bank, Avoncroft, Barnards Green, Barnt Green, Belbroughton, Bewdley, Birlingham, Bredon, Bromsgrove, Chaddesley Corbett, Cookhill, Cookley, Coombs Wood, Cutnall Green, Droitwich Spa, Feckenham, Five Ways Old Edwardians, Hagley, Hallow Taverners, Halesowen, Hanley Castle & Upton, Harvington, Himbleton, Inkberrow, Kempsey, Kidderminster, Knighton on Teme, Lye, Malvern, Martley, Netherton, Old Elizabethans, Old Halesonians, Oldswinford, Old Vigornians, Ombersley, Pedmore, Pershore, Redditch Entaco, Romsley & Hunnington, Rushwick, Stone, Stourbridge, Stourport-on-Severn, Tenbury Wells, West Malvern,  Worcester, Worcester Amigos, Worcester Nomads).   

 21 Herefordshire clubs (Almeley, Bartestree & Lugwardine, Bosbury, Brockhampton, Bromyard, Burghill, Tillington & Weobley, Canon Frome, Colwall, Dales, Eastnor, Fownhope Strollers, Garnons, Goodrich, Herefordians, Kington, Ledbury, Luctonians, Moccas, Ross-on-Wye, Woolhope, Wormelow). 

 4 Shropshire clubs (Alveley, Claverley, Cleobury Mortimer, Highley).

 3 Staffordshire clubs (Enville, Himley, Old Hill).

 3 Welsh clubs (Builth Wells, Hay-on-Wye, Presteigne).

 1 Warwickshire club (Harborne).

Famous players
84 First-Class and List A cricketers have played in the Worcestershire County Cricket League, including 17 internationals:

Internationals, and club represented
England
Steve Davies Victoria & Blakeley Hall (later merged with Kidderminster to form Kidderminster Victoria CC from 2003 to 2015)
Phil Newport Worcester Nomads
Neal Radford Evesham

New Zealand

Mark Craig Coombs Wood
Daniel Flynn Barnards Green
Cole McConchie Monmouth
West Indies
Fabian Allen Worcester
Andre Russell Barnards Green
Pakistan
Humayun Farhat Stourbridge
Imran Farhat Stourbridge
Abdur Rauf Brockhampton
Sri Lanka
Dinusha Fernando Bromyard
Chamila Gamage also known as Chamila Gamage Lakshitha, Alvechurch & Hopwood
Dharshana Gamage Kington
Zimbabwe
Innocent Kaia Worcester Nomads
Gus Mackay Barnt Green 3rd XI
Scotland 
Navdeep Poonia Old Hill

Other First Class and List A players, and club(s) represented
England
Steve Adshead Astwood Bank
Josh Baker Astwood Bank
Oliver Bailey Bromyard 
Christopher Boroughs Brockhampton
James Burgoyne Coombs Wood, Pedmore
Duncan Catterall Ombersley
Nigel Cowley Himbleton
Ben Cox Belbroughton
Nick Hammond Ombersley
Mark Hardinges Malvern
Zain-ul-Hassan Barnt Green
Phil Harris Barnards Green
Gavin Haynes Ombersley
Josh Haynes Worcester Nomads
Chris Harwood Colwall
Richard Howitt Colwall
Brett D'Oliveira Worcester Dominies & Guild
Damian D'Oliveira Ombersley
Stuart Lampitt Rushwick
Alex Milton Worcester Nomads
Ravi Nagra Old Hill 
Liam O'Driscoll Worcester Nomads
Matthew Pardoe Belbroughton
Harshad Patel Stourbridge 
Nitesh Patel Stourbridge
Karl Pearson Luctonians, Bromyard
Matthew Rawnsley Ombersley
George Rhodes Barnards Green, Rushwick
Nathan Round Coombs Wood
Ben Stebbings Kington
Naqaash Tahir Old Hill
William Thomas Ombersley
Josh Tongue Bromyard
Steve Watkins Wormelow
Gary Williams Bromyard
Jonathan Wright Old Hill
Australia
Michael Jeh Luctonians
Craig Jones Kington
Angus Robson Worcester Nomads
South Africa
Andre (Leon) Botha Pershore
Wesley Euley Droitwich Spa
Calvin Flowers Ombersley
Lundi Mbane Bromyard
Dillon Stanley Worcester Nomads
West Indies
Audley Alexander Stourbridge
Sergio Fedee Stourbridge
Mali Richards Stourbridge
New Zealand
Jonothon Boult Barnards Green, Bewdley, Droitwich Spa
Stefan Hook-Sporry Burghill, Tillington & Weobley
Jayden Lennox Harvington
Barry Rhodes Bromyard
India
Neeraj Chawla Coombs Wood
Sachin Khartade Worcester Nomads
Shashi Ranjan Alvechurch & Hopwood
Gagandeep Singh Redditch
Pakistan
Ahmed Jamal Bromyard
Atiq-ur-Rehman Eastnor
Hamza Nadeem Stourbridge
Khalid Mahmood Redditch
Mahmood Malik Brockhampton
Mohammad Ali Brockhampton
Zahid Saeed Ombersley, Bromyard
Sri Lanka
Lakshan Rodrigo Bromyard
Zimbabwe
Clive Chadhani Worcester, Old Elizabethans, Burghill, Tillington & Weobley
Leon Soma Droitwich Spa
Jason Young Barnards Green
Namibia
Xander Pitchers Worcester

External links
Official League Website

English domestic cricket competitions
Cricket in Worcestershire